Tom Morris, OBE (born 22 June 1964 in Stamford, Lincolnshire) is an English theatre director, writer and producer. He was the Artistic Director at BAC (Battersea Arts Centre) from 1995 to 2004, he has been Associate Director at the National Theatre since 2004 and Artistic Director of Bristol Old Vic since 2009.

Early life and education
Morris was born in 1964. He is the younger brother of satirist Chris Morris. He was educated at Stonyhurst College, a Jesuit boys' boarding independent school in Lancashire in north west England, and then read English Literature at Pembroke College at the University of Cambridge from 1983 to 1986.

Career
From 1988 to 1994, Morris taught English Literature and worked in broadcasting and journalism, as a critic and feature-writer for The Times Literary Supplement, The Independent, The Sunday Times, The Daily Telegraph, The Guardian and The Observer, and appeared on BBC television and radio programmes Kaleidoscope, Night Waves and The Late Show.

During this period he also founded Stage of Fools with Nick Vivian and Nick Sweeting, writing, acting and directing at the Edinburgh Fringe Festival and on tour.

In 1995, Morris became Artistic Director of Battersea Arts Centre (BAC), staying until 2004 when he joined the National Theatre.  While at BAC, Morris established the Scratch Programme, The Sam Shepherd Festival, The Critics Up for Review, The British Festival of Visual Theatre, Playing in the Dark (which marked the launch of Vanishing Point and Sound and Fury and included the first scratch version of Complicite's Mnemonic) and BAC Opera (which produced Jerry Springer: The Opera).  While at BAC he also wrote Ben Hur, Jason and the Argonauts and World Cup Final 1966 all with Carl Heap.

In September 2009 Morris took over as Artistic Director of Bristol Old Vic theatre, overseeing the theatre's revival with Executive Director Emma Stenning.  Morris and Stenning expanded the Old Vic's Outreach Programme into every part of the City, set up the widely imitated artist development programme, the Bristol Ferment, and restored the theatre's national and international reputation with West End transfers and national & international touring for Swallows and Amazons,  A Midsummer Night's Dream, Jane Eyre  and Peter Pan (both of which were re-created for the National Theatre) and festivals such as Bristol Jam and Bristol Proms. in 2010, he directed the debut production of Helen Edmundson's Swallows and Amazons at Bristol Old Vic.

In 2012 Morris & Stenning oversaw the first phase of a multimillion-pound redevelopment, which included the long-awaited refurbishment of the theatre's 250 year old auditorium and creation of new office and rehearsal spaces.  The second phase of redevelopment of Bristol Old Vic commenced in November 2016, designed by Steve Tompkins.  The plans included an overhaul of the front of house spaces and Studio theatre, and was completed in autumn 2018.

As well as directing many theatrical productions, Morris has directed and produced several operas, including The Death of Klinghoffer (ENO and the Met) and a staging of Handel's Messiah (Bristol Proms, 2013).

In 2011 he won the Tony Award for Best Direction of a Play for the Broadway production of War Horse, along with co-director Marianne Elliott. Morris was appointed Officer of the Order of the British Empire (OBE) in the 2016 Birthday Honours for services to theatre.

One interviewer said of Morris: "His tastes are catholic, and frequently risky, but they can produce some of the most inspired, inventive theatre in Britain today."

Tom Morris is on the board of innovating British theatre company Complicite, and is the founding chair of The JMK Trust, set up in honour of James Menzies-Kitchin to provide opportunities for talented young theatre directors.

Selected productions
1999: Macbeth, director, BAC
2001: Jerry Springer: The Opera, producer, BAC
2003-6: The Wooden Frock, Nights at the Circus, (co-writer with Emma Rice), "Kneehigh"
2005: Coram Boy, producer, National Theatre, Olivier
2007: A Matter of Life and Death, writer and adaptor, National Theatre, Olivier
2007–2011: War Horse, co-director and producer, National Theatre, Olivier; transferring to West End and Broadway.
2010: "Juliet and her Romeo", director, Bristol Old Vic
2010: Swallows and Amazons, director, Bristol Old Vic
2011: The Death of Klinghoffer, director, English National Opera; 2014 at the Metropolitan Opera
2013: A Midsummer Night's Dream, director, Bristol Old Vic
2015: The Crucible, director, Bristol Old Vic
2016: King Lear, director, Bristol Old Vic
2016-18: The Grinning Man, director, Bristol Old Vic/Trafalgar Studios
2017: Messiah, director, Bristol Old Vic
2018: Touching the Void, director, Bristol Old Vic & International tour

References

English theatre directors
British opera directors
Artistic directors
Living people
Tony Award winners
Alumni of Pembroke College, Cambridge
1964 births
Officers of the Order of the British Empire